Ralph Warren Norman Jr. (born June 20, 1953) is an American real estate developer and politician who has served as the U.S. representative for  since 2017. His district includes most of the South Carolina side of the Charlotte metropolitan area, along with outer portions of the Upstate and Midlands. A member of the Republican Party, Norman served as the South Carolina state representative for the 48th district from 2005 to 2007 and from 2009 to 2017.

Norman won a special election after Mick Mulvaney vacated his seat in Congress upon being appointed director of the Office of Management and Budget by President Donald Trump. As of 2019, with a net worth of $18.3 million, Norman is the 28th wealthiest member of Congress.

Early life and education
Norman was born in York County, South Carolina. He received a bachelor's degree in business from Presbyterian College in 1975.

Career 
Norman resides in Rock Hill, where he is a real estate developer at the Warren Norman Company, a business founded by and named after Norman's father.

South Carolina House of Representatives 
In 2004, Norman was elected to serve District 48 in the South Carolina House of Representatives, winning a three-way Republican primary outright with 52% of the vote. After one term, Norman chose not to run for reelection so he could become the 2006 Republican candidate for U.S. Congress in South Carolina's 5th congressional district against John Spratt. He lost to Spratt.

On November 3, 2009, Norman defeated Democrat Kathy Cantrell in a special election to reclaim his old seat.

U.S. House of Representatives

Elections

2017 special election

In December 2016, President Donald Trump nominated Mick Mulvaney for Director of the Office of Management and Budget (OMB). At the time, Mulvaney represented South Carolina's 5th Congressional District in the United States House of Representatives. Shortly after the nomination, and in anticipation that Mulvaney's seat in Congress would be vacated once the United States Senate confirmed him, Norman announced his intention to resign from the South Carolina House of Representatives to run for Congress.

On May 16, 2017, Norman won a Republican primary runoff election against Tommy Pope by a margin of 0.6%, triggering an automatic recount per South Carolina state law. Following that recount, the South Carolina State Election Commission certified Norman as the Republican nominee on May 19, 2017. With 35,425 votes cast, Norman received 17,823 to Pope's 17,602, a 221-vote difference.

Having secured the Republican nomination, Norman faced Democratic nominee Sumter attorney Archie Parnell in a special election on June 20. Norman received 51.0% of the vote to Parnell's 47.9%.

Norman was sworn into office on June 26, 2017.

2018

On March 19, 2018, Norman filed for reelection with the South Carolina Election Commission. Facing no primary challengers, he secured the Republican party nomination after the primary election on June 12.

Meanwhile, Parnell chose to run again for South Carolina's 5th Congressional District seat. He defeated three opponents to win the Democratic nomination, and faced Norman again in the general election.

The general election was on November 6. Norman was reelected with 57.0% of the vote to Parnell's 41.5%. State and national Democrats had distanced themselves from Parnell after news broke that he had abused his first wife.

2020 
Norman filed for reelection on March 16, 2020. He secured the Republican nomination after facing no Republican challengers in the primary election on June 12.

Norman went on to defeat Democrat Mauricus "Moe" Brown in the general election on November 3. He received 60.1% of the vote to Brown's 39.9%.

Tenure

Kavanaugh hearings joke 
On September 20, 2018, at an election debate for the Republican nomination, Norman joked about sexual assault allegations against Supreme Court nominee Brett Kavanaugh. He kicked off the debate asking the audience, "Did y'all hear this latest late-breaking news on the Kavanaugh hearings? ...Ruth Bader Ginsburg came out saying she was groped by Abraham Lincoln."

Firearm incident 
At a public meeting for constituents on April 6, 2018, Norman engaged in a conversation with representatives from Moms Demand Action for Gun Sense in America (MDA). During that conversation, he placed his .38-caliber Smith & Wesson handgun on the table to illustrate his belief that "gun violence is a spiritual, mental or people issue, not a gun issue." According to Norman, the loaded firearm was visible for "maybe a minute, or two minutes" and was never pointed at any individual, but MDA representatives who were seated at the table with Norman said the firearm was visible for "five to 10 minutes" and that they felt unsafe. Norman holds a concealed weapons permit issued by South Carolina.

The incident sparked widespread criticism of Norman. On April 9, 2018, South Carolina Democratic Party Chair Trav Robertson wrote the South Carolina Law Enforcement Division a letter requesting felony charges against Norman for his conduct. The case was originally assigned to South Carolina 16th Solicitor Kevin Brackett, but Brackett recused himself, citing a "personal friendship" with Norman. The issue was then forwarded to South Carolina Attorney General Alan Wilson, who declined to press charges, stating that Norman's actions did not "warrant a criminal investigation" or constitute "a prosecutable offense."

Conservative Political Action Conference attendance 
In late February 2021, Norman and a dozen other Republican House members skipped votes and enlisted others to vote for them, citing the ongoing COVID-19 pandemic. But he and the other members were actually attending the Conservative Political Action Conference, which was held at the same time as their slated absences. In response, the Campaign for Accountability, an ethics watchdog group, filed a complaint with the House Committee on Ethics and requested an investigation into Norman and the other lawmakers.

Conservative Opportunity Society 
In 2021, Norman was elected chair of the Conservative Opportunity Society.

COVID-19 pandemic 
In 2021, Norman violated House rules by not wearing a face mask in the House Chamber and was fined $500 as provided by the rules. Despite committing the infraction, he and two other Republican lawmakers sued Speaker Pelosi over the incident. Norman tested positive for COVID-19 on August 5, 2021, and reported that he had been fully vaccinated and had only mild symptoms.

Federal loans 
In August 2022, Norman criticized President Joe Biden for forgiving up to $10,000 of student loan debt for eligible borrowers. Norman was criticized for hypocrisy because he had $306,520 of debt from his PPP loan forgiven.

Political positions

Steve King 
In 2019, Norman joined a small group of House Republicans who sought to reinstate Representative Steve King on House committees. King had lost his committee positions due to a series of racist and white nationalist remarks. The group included Louie Gohmert and Paul Gosar. King was not reinstated.

Donald Trump 
Norman was described as a Trump ally during Donald Trump's presidency. After Joe Biden won the 2020 presidential election and Trump made claims of election fraud, Norman called for an investigation into fraud.

In December 2020, Norman was one of 126 Republican members of the House of Representatives to sign an amicus brief in support of Texas v. Pennsylvania, a lawsuit filed at the United States Supreme Court contesting the results of the 2020 presidential election, in which Joe Biden defeated Trump. The Supreme Court declined to hear the case on the basis that Texas lacked standing under Article III of the Constitution to challenge the results of an election held by another state.

On October 31, 2019, Norman voted with his fellow Republicans in opposition to a resolution outlining rules for then-ongoing impeachment inquiry against Donald Trump. On December 18, 2019, Norman voted against both of the articles of impeachment of the first impeachment of President Trump.

After Trump was impeached for his role in inciting a pro-Trump mob to storm the U.S. Capitol over false claims of election fraud, Norman criticized Representative Liz Cheney for voting to  impeach Trump. Norman said he was "bothered by Cheney's attitude". Norman himself voted against the second impeachment of Trump.

On January 17, 2021, Norman sent a text message to White House Chief of Staff Mark Meadows asking him to urge President Trump to invoke martial law (misspelling it 
'Marshall Law') to prevent the inauguration of Joseph Biden.

Biden administration 
Norman is a supporter of efforts to impeach President Biden. During the 117th United States Congress, he co-sponsored two resolutions to impeach Biden. He also co-sponsored resolutions to impeach Vice President Kamala Harris, Secretary of Homeland Security Alejandro Mayorkas, and Secretary of State Antony Blinken.

U.S. Capitol Police 
In June 2021, Norman was one of 21 House Republicans to vote against a resolution to give the Congressional Gold Medal to police officers who defended the U.S. Capitol on January 6.

Juneteenth 
In June 2021, Norman was one of 14 House Republicans to vote against legislation to establish June 19, or Juneteenth, as a federal holiday.

Afghanistan 
In July 2021, Norman was one of five House Republicans to vote against a bill that clears $2.1 billion for Afghan visas and Capitol Hill security.

Ukraine 
In February 2022, Norman co-sponsored the Secure America's Borders First Act, which would prohibit the expenditure or obligation of military and security assistance to Kyiv over the U.S. border with Mexico.

Syria 
In 2023, Norman was among 47 Republicans to vote in favor of H.Con.Res. 21, which directed President Joe Biden to remove U.S. troops from Syria within 180 days.

Committee assignments

Committee on Oversight and Reform
Subcommittee on Government Operations
Committee on Science, Space, and Technology
Subcommittee on Energy
Subcommittee on Investigations and Oversight
Committee on the Budget

Caucus memberships

Republican Study Committee
Freedom Caucus
Congressional Solar Caucus
Congressional Western Caucus
Congressional Waste-Cutters Caucus

Personal life 
Norman and his wife, Elaine, have four children and 17 grandchildren.

Norman is a Presbyterian.

Electoral history

References

External links

 Congressman Ralph Norman official U.S. House website
 Campaign website 
 
 
 
 Official Biography, South Carolina House of Representatives

|-

|-

|-

1953 births
21st-century American businesspeople
21st-century American politicians
American real estate businesspeople
American nationalists
Businesspeople from South Carolina
Candidates in the 2006 United States elections
Living people
American Presbyterians
Presbyterians from South Carolina
Republican Party members of the South Carolina House of Representatives
People from Rock Hill, South Carolina
Presbyterian College alumni
Republican Party members of the United States House of Representatives from South Carolina